The posterior sternoclavicular ligament is a band of fibers, covering the posterior surface of the sternoclavicular joint.  It is attached above to the upper and back part of the sternal end of the clavicle, and, passing obliquely downward and medialward, is fixed below to the back of the upper part of the manubrium sterni.

It is in relation, in front, with the articular disk and synovial membranes; behind, with the Sternohyoideus and Sternothyreoideus.

References 

Ligaments of the upper limb